The 122 mm howitzer M1909 was a Russian Empire 121.92 mm (4.8 inch) howitzer used throughout World War I.

Following the defeats of the Russo-Japanese War, Russia sought to modernize some of its equipment, which included the purchase of foreign designed artillery.  Seeking new systems from both France and Germany, the 122 mm howitzer M1909 was developed by the German arms manufacturer Krupp.  Russia also bought a very similar system from the French arms manufacturer Schneider et Cie, the 122 mm howitzer M1910.

It was later updated by the Soviet Union as the  122 mm howitzer M1909/37 which saw combat in the German-Soviet War.

Weapons of comparable role, performance and era
 122 mm howitzer M1910 - very similar piece in Russian service designed by Schneider et Cie
 QF 4.5-inch howitzer - British equivalent, in Russian service also
 10.5 cm Feldhaubitze 98/09 - early German equivalent
 10.5 cm leFH 16 - later German equivalent
 10 cm M. 14 Feldhaubitze - Austro-Hungarian equivalent

References

World War I guns
World War I artillery of Russia
122 mm artillery